Ramesh Chandra Bhanja (17 April 1940 – 18 March 2015) was a writer, teacher, educationist, linguist, historian, editor and dramatist from Odisha. He has written many short-stories & poetry collections for children of all age groups. For his book Gapa Ganthili (short story compilation), he received the Odisha Sahitya Academy Award.

Early life and family
Ramesh Chandra Bhanja was born in a Kshatriya family in Garh Haladia village in Khordha district (erstwhile Puri district). He belongs to the lineage of Bhanj dynasty who were erstwhile rulers of Ghumusara (Ganjam district), Kendujhar (Keonjhar district) and Baripada (Mayurbhanj district). Kavi Samrat Upendra Bhanja is also his ancestor. His own family consists of his wife, 3 sons and 2 daughters.

Bhanja's early education (primary schooling) started in his native village Garh Haladia. After the Middle English (ମାଇନର୍‌) level, he left for Banki (in Cuttack district) for his high school education. After high school, he moved to Cuttack for college education. There too he started his early professional career.

Books 
 Kathi Kuta Patara (Poem Collection), April 1980
 Bheri Toori Mahuri (Poem Collection), April 1980
 Gapa Ganthili (Story collection), January 1981
 Katha Kothali (Story Collection), December 1981
 Muthaey Mahak (Story collection), December 1982
 Katha Kahuchi Suna (Story Collection), October 2013

Awards and honors
 Odisha Sahitya Academy Award (Bhubaneshwar), 1982
 Vishub Puraskar (by Prajatantra Prachar Samity, Cuttack), 2003
 Odia Children's Literature Award (by Kala Vikash Kendra, Cuttack),
 Khadi & Gamyodyog Literature Award (by Odisha Khadi & Gamyodyog Board, Bhubaneshwar),
 Harekrishna Shishu Sahitya Puraskar by Fakir Mohan Sahitya Parisshad (Baleshwar), 1996
 Jnana Jyoti Puraskar by Koradha Vishuv Milan (Khordha), 2011
 Bhubaneswar Pustak Mela Puraskar for Children's Literature (for the book KathA Kahuchi SuNa : କଥା କହୁଛି ଶୁଣ), 2014

References 

1940 births
2015 deaths
People from Khordha district
Indian male poets
Poets from Odisha
Writers from Odisha
Odia-language writers
Odia short story writers
Odia-language poets
Indian children's writers
Recipients of the Odisha Sahitya Akademi Award
20th-century Indian male writers
20th-century Indian poets
20th-century Indian short story writers